Balgopal Mishra (born 5 November 1941 in Titlagarh, Bolangir district, Orissa) is an Indian politician and was member of the Bharatiya Janata Party. He is a member of the Odisha Legislative Assembly from the Loisingha constituency in Bolangir district as well as was member of 9th Lok Sabha from Bolangir constituency as Janata Dal candidate.

References 

People from Balangir district
Bharatiya Janata Party politicians from Odisha
Members of the Odisha Legislative Assembly
Living people
21st-century Indian politicians
Janata Dal politicians
India MPs 1989–1991
Lok Sabha members from Odisha
1941 births